Nahre Sol (born 1991) is a Korean-American composer, pianist, and YouTuber.

Youth and education
Nahre Sol attended the Orange County High School of the Arts and graduated from the Idyllwild Arts Academy in 2009, where she was class valedictorian and recipient of The Most Outstanding Arts Student award. She received her Bachelor of Music degree in piano performance from the Juilliard School in 2013, studying with Matti Raekallio, and her Artist Diploma from and participated in a fellowship at The Glenn Gould School of The Royal Conservatory of Music in Toronto, Canada in 2015, studying with John O'Conor. She also participated in master classes at the International Mendelssohn-Academy Leipzig and at the International Holland Music Sessions as a scholarship recipient. She was a 2013 recipient of a Fulbright France Harriet Hale Woolley Award in the Arts Grant, allowing her to study in Paris with Gabriel Tacchino and Narcis Bonet, pupils of Francis Poulenc and Nadia Boulanger.

While at Juilliard, she co-founded the T.R.I.O. Project (Teaching and Responding Through Internet Outreach). She also contributed a set of recordings of the Chopin Scherzos to Musopen's compilation of Chopin's works, which were released under a public domain license. In Toronto, she was co-director of the chamber music collective Happenstance.

Competitions and awards
Sol was the Gold Medal Winner of the NFAA YoungARTS program, a semi-finalist of the Presidential Scholars in the Arts Program, recipient of the Sarra and Emmanuil Senderov Award at Arizona State University for the “Most outstanding performance of a piece by a Russian composer” at the 3rd Schimmel USASU International Piano Competition, and won prizes at the “Tomorrow’s Stars” Competition held by the Orange County Performing Arts Center, the Spotlight Awards, the Idyllwild Arts Academy Concerto Competition, the Steinway Society of Redlands Piano Competition, the Young Artists Peninsula Music Festival, the Redlands Bowl Young Artists Auditions, the MTAC State Concerto Competition, the 2008 Bronislaw Kaper Awards for Young Artists, and the Young Pianist Category of Southwestern Youth Music Festival. She also was a contestant in such competitions as the William Kapell International Piano Competition and the 2015 National Chopin Competition in Miami, Florida.

Personal life
After graduating from the Glenn Gould School, Sol abandoned her traditional piano performance career, working for some time as a commercial photographer, before resuming her musical activities through a series of videos on YouTube under the title Practice Notes using the name Nahre Sol, a nickname her father used to call her.

Recognition as Nahre Sol
Nahre Sol is best known for her YouTube channel, with around 511,000 subscribers as of October 2022, and as being co-host of the PBS Digital Studios show "Sound Field".  She has also been a guest host of NPR's Performance Today, created a video for Wired magazine, appeared as a guest on the online channel Physics Girl, and collaborated with other composers and musicians such as David Bruce, Andrew Huang, Adam Neely, L.A. Buckner, Tantacrul, and Ben Levin. She was nominated in the category Best YouTube Musician in the 12th Annual Shorty Awards in 2020. The blog Pianote featured her YouTube channel in 2021 as #1 on their list of top YouTube pianists. She was a guest artist at the 2018 Costa Rica Piano Festival.

As a composer, Nahre Sol has had works commissioned by the Manitoba Chamber Orchestra and her music was used in the film The Boss Baby: Family Business. In 2021, she released a digital album called Alice in Wonderland.

References

External links
 

Nahre Sol's page on BandCamp
Nahre Sol's channel on SoundCloud
Nahre Sol's channel on YouTube

Music YouTubers
American classical pianists
American women classical pianists
Women classical pianists
American classical musicians
American composers
American contemporary classical composers
American women classical composers
American classical composers
American women composers
Composers for piano
21st-century classical composers
21st-century classical pianists
21st-century pianists
21st-century American pianists
21st-century American women pianists
21st-century women musicians
Women in classical music
Juilliard School alumni
The Royal Conservatory of Music alumni
1991 births
Living people